Ferrosur Roca S.A. (FR) is a private company which operates freight services over part of the  broad gauge that belongs to General Roca Railway.

Some of the products transported by Ferrosur Roca include salt, clincker, plaster, cement, lime, cereals, fertilizers, coking coal, iron scrap, petroleum and fuel oil, among other items. The company transported a total of 5,258,301 tonnes of freight in 2014.

The company, property of the Camargo Correa group, is 80% owned by the Cofesur group, 16% State-owned and 4% owned by employees of the company through Personal de Ferrosur S.A.

History

After all the Argentine rail network was privatised during Carlos Menem's administration in early 1990s, concession was granted to Ferrosur Roca to operate freight services in the center and south of Argentina running on Ferrocarril Roca tracks.

The company began its activities on March 12, 1993 over a  rail network extending south and southwest from Buenos Aires through the provinces of Buenos Aires, Rio Negro and Neuquén and serving the ports of Bahía Blanca, Quequén and San Antonio Oeste. The branch from Bahía Blanca to Zapala serves the commercially important Rio Negro fruit-growing region.

Ferrosur's fleet include 2,550 wagons, 31 mainline diesel locomotives and 15 shunters and its rail network has points of connection with other freight services operated by Ferroexpreso Pampeano, Nuevo Central Argentino and América Latina Logística.

See also 
 Camargo Correa
 General Roca Railway
 Rail transport in Argentina

References

External links 

 Official website (archived)

Railway companies of Argentina
Railway companies established in 1992
5 ft 6 in gauge railways in Argentina
1993 establishments in Argentina
Rail transport in Buenos Aires Province
Transport in Río Negro Province
Transport in Neuquén Province